Livia Lang (born 3 June 1994) is an Austrian synchronized swimmer. She competed in the women's duet at the 2012 Summer Olympics.

References 

1994 births
Living people
Austrian synchronized swimmers
Olympic synchronized swimmers of Austria
Synchronized swimmers at the 2012 Summer Olympics